Roger Machado Morales (born March 31, 1974 in Morón, Ciego de Ávila Province, Cuba) is a defensive-minded catcher with Ciego de Ávila of the Cuban National Series. He is the National Series' all-time leader in throwing out baserunners.

Machado was part of the Cuba national baseball team that brought home the gold medal from the 2004 Summer Olympics. They took a second place at 2006 World Baseball Classic. Ariel Pestano starts ahead of Machado on the national team.{?}

References

External links
 

1974 births
Living people
Olympic baseball players of Cuba
Olympic gold medalists for Cuba
Olympic medalists in baseball
Medalists at the 2004 Summer Olympics
Baseball players at the 2004 Summer Olympics
Pan American Games gold medalists for Cuba
Baseball players at the 2003 Pan American Games
2006 World Baseball Classic players
Pan American Games medalists in baseball
Medalists at the 2003 Pan American Games
People from Morón, Cuba